Blow Your Trumpets Gabriel is the seventh EP by Polish extreme metal band Behemoth. It was released on 4 December 2013 through the band's record label New Aeon Musick. Blow Your Trumpets Gabriel was limited to 2000 copies, available only through Behemoth Webstore and Nuclear Blast Store, most copies bought through Behemoth's webstore were signed by the band. The EP features three tracks, including title song, and two non-album tracks "If I Were Cain", along with cover of Siekiera's "Ludzie wschodu".

Track listing

Personnel

Release history

References 

2013 EPs
Behemoth (band) EPs
Albums produced by Adam Darski